The following is a list of forts in South Dakota.

Forts in South Dakota

See also
 List of ghost towns in South Dakota

References
 
 

Forts
South Dakota